Nurmalitsy is a former Soviet Air Forces base in Russia located 8 km north of Olonec.  It was shown on the 1974 Department of Defense Global Navigation Chart No. 3 as having jet facilities.  It is now bulldozed to the ground.

The base was home to the 88th Independent Helicopter Squadron between 1967 and 1977.

References

External links
RussianAirFields.com

Soviet Air Force bases